The Romanian Orthodox Metropolia of the Americas is an autonomous Eastern Orthodox metropolis of the Romanian Orthodox Church. The Metropolia covers the territory of the United States and Canada.

The church is headed by Nicolae, Archbishop of the Romanian Orthodox Archdiocese of the United States of America and The Romanian Orthodox Metropolitan of the Americas, with the metropolitan center located in Chicago, Illinois.

Administration and structure
The church is divided into one archdiocese and one diocese, each organized into three geographical deaneries, around which the parishes are grouped.

Archdioceses and Archbishops
Romanian Orthodox Archdiocese of the United States of America: Nicolae
Eastern USA Deanery
Central USA Deanery
Western USA Deanery

Dioceses and Bishops
Romanian Orthodox Diocese of Canada: Ioan Casian de Vicina
Eastern Canada Deanery
Central Canada Deanery
Western Canada Deanery

See also
 List of members of the Holy Synod of the Romanian Orthodox Church

References

External links
 Official Website
Romanian Orthodox Metropolia of the Americas at patriarhia.ro
List of Parishes and Monasteries
 News of the Romanian Orthodox Metropolia of the Americas at doxologia.ro 

Romanian-American history
Romanian-Canadian history
America and Canada
Eastern Orthodoxy in the United States
Eastern Orthodox dioceses in Canada